Free Yourself Up is the sixth studio album by Lake Street Dive. It was released through Nonesuch Records on May 4, 2018 both as a CD and on vinyl and various electronic formats. The album was produced by Lake Street Dive with Dan Knobler.

Critical reception
Free Yourself Up was met with generally favorable reviews from critics. At Metacritic, which assigns a weighted average rating out of 100 to reviews from mainstream publications, this release received an average score of 66, based on 7 reviews.

Track listing

Personnel
Mike Calabrese – drums, percussion and vocals 
Bridget Kearney – bass and vocals
Mike "McDuck" Olson – guitar, trumpet and maybe vocals
Rachael Price – lead vocals
Akie Bermiss – keyboards and vocals
Jamie Dick – additional drums on Dude

Technical personnel

Dan Knobler - engineering at Goosehead Palace, Nashville TN
Joe Visciano –  mixing at Studio II2 in Brooklyn NY
Randy Merrilln – mastering at Sterling Sound, New York NY
Design
Ben Tousley – art direction and design
Shervin Lainezh – photography

Charts

References

2018 albums
Lake Street Dive albums
Nonesuch Records albums